Legislative elections were held in Equatorial Guinea on 7 March 1999. They were won by the Democratic Party of Equatorial Guinea of President Teodoro Obiang Nguema Mbasogo, which took 75 of the 80 seats in the Chamber of People's Representatives.

Results

References

Elections in Equatorial Guinea
Equatorial Guinea
Election
Election and referendum articles with incomplete results